Cobban is an unincorporated community located in the town of Arthur, Chippewa County, Wisconsin, United States.

History
A post office called Cobban was established in 1904, and remained in operation until 1934. The community was named for S. C. F. Cobban, a landowner.

References

Unincorporated communities in Chippewa County, Wisconsin
Unincorporated communities in Wisconsin